, son of regent Nijō Morotsugu, was a Japanese poet and kugyō (court noble) of the Muromachi period (1336–1573). He held regent positions kampaku two times from 1424 to 1428 and from 1433 to 1445, and sesshō two times from 1428 to 1432 and from 1432 to 1433. He was the father of Nijō Mochimichi.

References

 

1390 births
1445 deaths
Fujiwara clan
Motonori